Taxiphyllum is a genus of mosses in the family Hypnaceae.

Description
Moss in the genera are generally medium to large sized and mat forming. Stems are glossy and creeping.

Species are native to North America, South America, Africa, and on islands in the Indian Ocean and Pacific Ocean. Specifically, they have been found in the United States, Mexico, West Indies, Guatemala, India, Japan, Madagascar, Philippines, and Australia.

Taxiphyllum barbieri is economically important as a common plant used in freshwater aquariums. It is sold under the name 'Java moss'.

Species
Species adapted from The Plant List;

Taxiphyllum alare 
Taxiphyllum alternans 
Taxiphyllum angustirete 
Taxiphyllum aomoriense 
Taxiphyllum arcuatum 
Taxiphyllum assimile 
Taxiphyllum barbieri 
Taxiphyllum cavernicola 
Taxiphyllum cuspidifolium 
Taxiphyllum densifolium 
Taxiphyllum deplanatum 
Taxiphyllum eberhardtii 
Taxiphyllum elegantifrons 
Taxiphyllum eximium 
Taxiphyllum geophilum 
Taxiphyllum giraldii 
Taxiphyllum gracile 
Taxiphyllum hisauchii 
Taxiphyllum isopterygioides 
Taxiphyllum kuroiwae 
Taxiphyllum laevifolium 
Taxiphyllum ligulaefolium 
Taxiphyllum mariannae 
Taxiphyllum minutirameum 
Taxiphyllum moutieri 
Taxiphyllum nitidum 
Taxiphyllum papuanum 
Taxiphyllum pilosum 
Taxiphyllum planifrons 
Taxiphyllum prostratum 
Taxiphyllum robusticaule 
Taxiphyllum robustum 
Taxiphyllum sadoense 
Taxiphyllum scalpellifolium 
Taxiphyllum schweinfurthii 
Taxiphyllum serrulatum 
Taxiphyllum splendescens 
Taxiphyllum squamatulum 
Taxiphyllum subarcuatum 
Taxiphyllum subassimile 
Taxiphyllum taxirameum 
Taxiphyllum torrentium 
Taxiphyllum tsunodae 
Taxiphyllum wissgrillii

References

Hypnaceae
Moss genera